"No Vaseline" is a diss track by American rapper Ice Cube from his 1991 album Death Certificate. The song was written and produced by Ice Cube and Sir Jinx.

The UK release of Death Certificate omitted this song, along with the 46-second long "Black Korea".

The song contains vicious lyrics and remarks towards Ice Cube's former group, N.W.A, which Ice Cube left in December 1989 due to royalty issues. The antagonists are his former bandmates, Eazy-E, Dr. Dre, MC Ren, DJ Yella and their manager, Jerry Heller, whom Ice Cube blames for causing the rift in the group.

Information
Ice Cube recorded this song in response to the comments N.W.A made towards him in their albums 100 Miles and Runnin' and Niggaz4Life.  He had made some brief disses to N.W.A. in the Kill at Will EP, mocking the phrase "hundred miles and running" on "Jackin' for Beats" and ending "I Gotta Say What Up!!!" with an answer-phone message asking what had happened to the other members of the group, which leads to Ice Cube hanging up on the caller.

The first minute of the song is a reference to N.W.A's "Message to B.A.", in which they call Ice Cube "Benedict Arnold" as well as an "Ice-T wannabe". Ice Cube then begins his full-blown diss on the group and their manager, Jerry Heller.

Ice Cube addresses Eazy-E and Heller, employing particularly harsh words to criticize Eazy's decision to align himself with Heller: "Heard you both got the same bank account / Dumb nigga, What you thinkin' 'bout?". He uses homophobic and antisemitic slurs as he accuses both Eazy-E and Heller of unfairly exploiting the rest of the group: "You little maggot, Eazy E turned faggot / With your manager, fella -- fuckin' MC Ren, Dr. Dre, and Yella" and "It's a case of divide and conquer, 'cause you let a Jew break up my crew", and, finally, he claims that this alliance has reduced Eazy's credibility: "house nigga gotta run and hide, yellin' Compton but you moved to Riverside".

Heller is not simply dissed as being a bad manager; he is given an antisemitic death-threat: "Get rid of that Devil real simple / Put a bullet in his temple / ’Cause you can’t be the Nigga 4 Life crew / With a white Jew telling you what to do / Pulling wools with your scams / Now I gotta play Silence of the Lambs." "A bullet in his temple" is a double-entendre, referring both to a fatal shot to Heller's head and also to a shooting at a Jewish temple or house of worship; the movie The Silence of the Lambs is about a killer.

Ice Cube continues the homophobic slurs as he refers to his decision to leave Ruthless Records: "Lookin' like straight bozos, I saw it comin', that's why I went solo ... You got jealous when I got my own company. But I'm a man, and ain't nobody humpin' me."

Politically, Ice Cube also references Eazy's appearance at a lunch benefiting the Republican Senatorial inner circle, hosted by then-President George H. W. Bush, repeatedly saying, "I never have dinner with the President."

The song appears on the Death Row Greatest Hits compilation album. Although the song was not released on Death Row Records, it is believed that Suge Knight included it as an act of animosity towards Dr. Dre as the song includes numerous disses towards him. "No Vaseline" was track number 20 in the track listing of Death Certificate and was the B-side for the album single "Steady Mobbin'".

Aftermath

N.W.A never responded to the song as a group. Not long after the release, Dr. Dre left the group, citing lack of monetary compensation. This led to N.W.A's dissolution as its members went on to start their solo careers.

In 1992, the implied death threat against Heller led Rabbi Abraham Cooper of the Los Angeles Jewish human rights organization, the Simon Wiesenthal Center, to observe, "We're not asking Ice Cube to mask the reality of the streets. By all means flag the social problems, but don't exploit them by turning a professional spat between a former manager and an artist into a racial dispute." "It's wrong for the rabbi to call me anti-Semitic," Cube responded. "I respect Jewish people because they're unified. I wish black people were as unified."

In 1993 Dr. Dre and his protégé Snoop Dogg dissed Eazy-E in the song "Fuck wit Dre Day (and Everybody's Celebratin')" and also referenced Heller in the video, prompting Eazy-E to respond that same year with "Real Muthaphuckkin G's"

In 2006 Jerry Heller's book Ruthless: A Memoir, written with Gil Reavill, was published by Simon & Schuster/Simon Spotlight Entertainment. In it Heller mentioned the song "No Vaseline" and wrote that he didn't believe that Ice Cube was genuinely antisemitic, but that he had exploited prejudices in the African-American community to further his career.

According to a 2013 interview with Ice Cube, when Eazy-E was close to death in 1995 from AIDS, Cube and Dre visited Eazy in the hospital. Cube stated Dre claimed that Eazy was unconscious. Cube left the hospital without seeing Eazy and told Dre to call him when he woke up. Dre later called Cube and told him that Eazy had died.

In 2022, Kanye West stated in an interview that Ice Cube's lyrics had "really influenced" him to "get on this antisemite vibe". Ice Cube responded by distancing himself from Ye's antisemitic remarks, tweeting, "I don’t know what Ye meant by his statements, you’re gonna have to ask him. I didn’t put the batteries in his back. Please leave my name out of all the antisemitic talk. I’m not antisemitic and never have been."

Certifications

Samples 
 "Dazz" by Brick
 "Vapors" by Biz Markie
 "Atomic Dog" by George Clinton
 "Hit by a Car" by Eddie Murphy
 "Turn Off the Radio" and "Better Off Dead" by Ice Cube
 "It's My Thing" by Marva Whitney
 "To Da Break of Dawn" by LL Cool J
 "Dope Man", "8 Ball", "A Bitch Iz a Bitch", "Message to B.A." and "Prelude" by N.W.A
 "Ball of Confusion (That's What the World Is Today)" by The Temptations

See also
List of notable diss tracks

References

Ice Cube songs
1991 songs
Songs written by Ice Cube
Diss tracks
Gangsta rap songs
N.W.A
Songs against racism and xenophobia
Songs based on actual events
Antisemitism in the United States
African American–Jewish relations
Race-related controversies in music